Rhamphorrhina is a genus of beetles belonging to the subfamily Cetoniinae.

The species of this genus are found in Southern Africa.

Species:
 Rhamphorrhina bertolonii (Lucas, 1879) 
 Rhamphorrhina splendens (Bertoloni, 1855)

References

Scarabaeidae
Scarabaeidae genera